Euzopherodes liturosella is a species of snout moth in the genus Euzopherodes. It was described by Nikolay Grigoryevich Erschoff in 1874. It is found in Turkmenistan.

References

Moths described in 1874
Phycitini